Yüzbaşılı or Yuzbaşlı or Yuzbashly or Yuzbashyly may refer to:
Birinci Yüzbaşılı, Azerbaijan 
İkinci Yüzbaşılı, Azerbaijan